Since the early 2000s, Muslims in Spain have lobbied the Catholic Church to permit Muslim prayer in the Mosque–Cathedral of Córdoba. The cathedral was originally a Visigothic Catholic church, before coming under Muslim control during the era of Al-Andalus and being converted into a mosque, where it would undergo further renovations and expansion until eventually being reverted into a Catholic Christian cathedral during the Reconquista.

Currently, Muslim prayer is often stopped by security guards. Spanish Catholic authorities were opposed to the request as of 2012, and the Vatican has been asked to intercede but has not responded.

Background

The building was begun around the year 500 as the Arian Christian Visigothic church of St. Vincent. After the Islamic conquest of the Visigothic kingdom, the church was divided between the Muslims and Christians. When the exiled Umayyad prince Abd ar-Rahman I escaped to Spain and defeated the Andalusian governor Yusuf al-Fihri, he allowed the Christians to rebuild their ruined churches, and purchased the Christian half of the church of St. Vincent.

Abd ar-Rahman I and his descendants reworked it over two centuries to refashion it as a mosque, starting in 784. Additionally, Abd ar-Rahman I used the mosque (originally called Aljama Mosque) as an adjunct to his palace and named it to honor his wife.
Traditionally, the mihrab of a mosque faces in the direction of Mecca; by facing the mihrab, worshipers pray towards Mecca. Mecca is east-southeast of the mosque, but the mihrab points south. 

The mosque underwent numerous subsequent changes: Abd ar-Rahman III ordered a new minaret, while Al-Hakam II, in 961, enlarged the building and enriched the mihrab. The last of the reforms was carried out by Al-Mansur Ibn Abi Aamir in 987. It was connected to the Caliph's palace by a raised walk-way, mosques within the palaces being the tradition for the Islamic rulers of all times. The Mezquita reached its current dimensions in 987 with the completion of the outer naves and courtyard.

The Castillian Reconquest

In 1236, Córdoba was conquered by King Ferdinand III of Castile in the Reconquista, and the mosque was turned back into a church. Alfonso X oversaw the construction of the Villaviciosa Chapel and the Royal Chapel within the mosque. To commemorate the reconquest, a statue of Saint James Matamoros, seen trampling Moors, was added near the front of the Royal Chapel. The kings who followed added further Christian features, such as King Henry II rebuilding the chapel in the 14th century. The minaret of the mosque was also converted to the bell tower of the cathedral. It was adorned with Santiago de Compostela’s captured cathedral bells.

The most significant alteration was the building of a Renaissance cathedral nave right in the middle of the expansive structure. The insertion was constructed by permission of Charles V, king of Castile and Aragon.

Artisans and architects continued to add to the existing structure until the late 18th century.

Current Muslim campaign

Some Muslims across Spain are lobbying the Catholic Church to allow them to pray in the cathedral. The Islamic Council of Spain had lodged a formal request with the Vatican for Muslims to be allowed to pray in the church. Spanish church authorities oppose Muslim prayer at the cathedral.

Zakarias Maza, the director of the Taqwa mosque in neighbouring Granada stated in 2004: "We hope the Vatican will give a signal that it has a vision of openness and dialogue. It would be good if there were a gesture of tolerance on their part. The church council doesn't seem to be open to dialogue."

"In no way is this request about reclaiming our rights — far less any kind of reconquest," stated Isabel Romero, a member of the Islamic Council of Spain in 2004. "Instead, we want to give our support to the universal character of this building". Rosa Aguilar, then mayor of Córdoba for the United Left, expressed support for the Islamic Council's position.

On Christmas Day 2006, a Spanish Muslim organisation called the Spanish Islamic Board, sent a letter to the Papal nuncio to Spain, asking Pope Benedict XVI for permission for Muslims to worship alongside Christians in the building, noting that they did not intend to take control of the building or "recover a nostalgic Al-Andalus". In 2004, the Vatican's Pontifical Council for Inter-religious Dialogue had rejected a similar request from the same group. The general secretary of the Spanish Islamic Board, Mansur Escudero, said that security guards often stop Muslim worshippers from praying inside the building.

2010 Muslim praying incident

In April 2010, two Muslim tourists were arrested at the cathedral, after an incident in which two security guards were seriously injured. The incident occurred when the building was filled with tourists visiting the cathedral during Holy Week.

According to cathedral authorities, when half a dozen Muslim citizens of Austria, who were part of a group of 118 people on an organized tour for young Muslims in Europe, knelt to pray at the same time, security guards stepped in and “invited them to continue with their tour or leave the building”. When two men refused to comply, a scuffle broke out and police were called. Two security guards were seriously injured, and the two Muslim men were detained. Spanish media, citing police sources, said that one of the men arrested had been carrying a knife.

In a statement Catholic authorities condemned the incident: “They provoked in an organized fashion a deplorable episode of violence.” After the 2010 incident, Spain's Catholic clergy reiterated that they would not be allowing any other religions to practice inside their Catholic Cathedral. Catholic authorities stated that "This one-off incident does not represent the genuine attitude of Muslims, many of whom maintain an attitude of respect and dialogue with the Catholic church".

References

Catholic Church in Spain
Córdoba, Spain
Islam in Spain
Mosque-related controversies in Europe